Gasetoa Fepuleai (known as Toa or Gus Fepuleai) is a New Zealand former rugby league footballer who represented New Zealand .

Early years
Fepuleai was born in Western Samoa and attended Seddon High School where he played at fullback in the school's rugby union first XV.

Playing career
Fepuleai joined the Richmond rugby league club in the Auckland Rugby League competition. In 1976 he won the Tetley Trophy as top try scorer.

He made his New Zealand national rugby league team debut in 1978, on the wing.

In 1979 Fepuleai played for both Auckland and New Zealand Māori against the touring Great Britain Lions side. He was also a part of the Richmond side that won the Auckland premiership in 1979, a title they defended in 1980.

Later years
Fepuleai later served as the chairman of the Richmond Rovers club.

References

Year of birth missing (living people)
New Zealand rugby league players
New Zealand national rugby league team players
Auckland rugby league team players
Rugby league wingers
Richmond Bulldogs players
New Zealand Māori rugby league players
New Zealand rugby league administrators
Living people